List of windmills in Limburg may refer to:

List of windmills in Limburg (Belgium)
List of windmills in Limburg (Netherlands)